Bítovany is a municipality and village in Chrudim District in the Pardubice Region of the Czech Republic. It has about 400 inhabitants.

Administrative parts
The village of Bítovánky is an administrative part of Bítovany.

History
The first written mention of Bítovany is from 1347.

Sights
The landmark of Bítovany and the oldest building is the Church of Saint Bartholomew. It was first mentioned in 1350 as a Gothic parish church. After 1650, baroque modifications were made. The current neo-Gothic appearance dates from 1883.

References

External links

 

Villages in Chrudim District